Pekka Meriläinen (11 January 1886 - 9 April 1926) was a Finnish stonemason and politician, born in Nurmes. He was a member of the Parliament of Finland from 1924 until his death in 1926, representing the Social Democratic Party of Finland (SDP).

References

1886 births
1926 deaths
People from Nurmes
People from Kuopio Province (Grand Duchy of Finland)
Social Democratic Party of Finland politicians
Members of the Parliament of Finland (1924–27)